= Thouththourbia =

Town of ancient Cilicia

Coordinates: 36°56′24″N 32°34′47″E

Thouththourbia was a town of ancient Cilicia, inhabited in Roman times. The name does not occur among ancient authors but is inferred from epigraphic and other evidence.

Its site is located near Oduncu Kalesi, Asiatic Turkey.
